Ramor United  are a Gaelic football club from Virginia, County Cavan in Ireland.  They are affiliated to Cavan GAA.

History
The Story of Ramor United began in 1971, when the 3 clubs in the parish – Maghera McFinns, Lurgan GFC and Virginia Blues – amalgamated for the Senior Championship only.  This coming-together cumulated in the Senior Championship coming to the parish of Lurgan as a whole for the first time in 1974.

Following from this, a new sense of parish effort evolved. A well-attended meeting in the courthouse in Virginia in 1976, under the chairmanship of County Board Chairman, Paddy C Donoghue, saw the very large enthusiastic crowd from all corners of the parish favouring a more permanent alliance, namely Ramor United GFC, as a single parish club.

The name "Ramor United" was chosen as it represents Lough Ramor and its embodiment through the Parish, just like Ramor GFC would represent the parish as one entity. The name is unusual, with "United" being more associated with association football (soccer); only one other GAA club uses the same word, Laragh United, also in Cavan. Ramor United soon built itself up as a force to be reckoned with within the county. This was emphasised by the capturing of the Junior B Championship in 1978, and both the U-21 Championship and Senior Division 2 League in 1980. In 1982, under the chairmanship of Patsy McDonnell the club bought the "Football field" from Dick McDonnell, a former Virginia Blues player. The deal allowed the staggering of payment over three years. Huge fundraising was undertaken by the committee and the target was met. The hard working members were already planning the development of the field; the galvanised fence along the road was removed and replaced by a beautiful hedge. A viewing stand, dugouts, goalposts and a railing around the field were erected by the club members.
 
A further acre of ground was purchased for a clubhouse and car park. The new clubhouse was designed by local clubman Jimmy Costello. It now has a fully equipped gym and is often used by other clubs. The clubhouse and football field were officially opened by Peter Brady County Board Chairman on 6 May 1990. It was a proud day for the club and a credit to committee members, players and supporters. The grounds received the "most improved grounds award" from Cavan Co. Board in 1991.
 
In the meantime Ramor continued to prove themselves where it matters – on the football pitch, by winning a historic double in 1985, with the capturing of the Senior Championship and the Senior League Division 1 and repeating success in 1986 with the capturing of the Senior League. Team manager was the well-loved and respected Fr. Tom McKiernan. The buzz and excitement within the club around this time, supported by brand new club facilities and an air of confidence within the team meant that Ramor were up there with the top guns in the county.
 
The 1990s started triumphantly for the Virginia side, winning the Division 1A league title both in 1990 and 1991.  1992 was to be Ramor's year when a young, vibrant team, mixed with experience, and under the guidance of former player John Mulvanny, captured the Senior Championship, beating Bailieboro Shamrocks by a single point in the final. The icing on the cake was the capturing of the Denn Tournament, which is renowned for attracting the best talent of the neighbouring counties.
 
In autumn of 1993, a piece of land – about 5 acres adjacent to the clubhouse – became available, the club bought the land including access to the lake. In the past few years a viewing stand with wheel-chair access and toilet facilities has been built on the 2nd pitch mainly by the grounds committee. At present, the new pitch is extensively used and has proved itself to be a great foresight by the Committee; the club also have a hard-core running track on the top pitch.
 
The Juniors were worthy winners of the Junior B Championship in 1996 and retained their title in 1997. Ramor won the Senior League in 1996. Ramor won  the Senior Division 2 League in 2008

Ramor United won the Cavan Senior Football Championship title in 2016 beating Castlerahan in the final after a replay and thus bridging a 24-year gap since their last triumph.

Kit
Ramor United's kit consists of amber jerseys with black trim, black shorts and black socks with amber trim.

Football titles
 Cavan Senior Football Championship: 5
 1974, 1985, 1992, 2016, 2021
 Cavan Under-21 Football Championship: 5
 1977, 1980, 2008, 2009, 2010, 2015, 2016
 Cavan Minor Football Championship: 4
 2013, 2015, 2017, 2022

References

External links
Official Cavan GAA Website
Cavan Club GAA
Ramor United Website

Gaelic games clubs in County Cavan
Gaelic football clubs in County Cavan